Wendell Paul Alexis (born July 31, 1964) is a retired American professional basketball player who played for several European clubs, between 1986 and 2004, most notably for ALBA Berlin, where he was voted MVP of the German Bundesliga four times, during his 6-year stay with the club.

High school
Alexis attended and played basketball at Christ The King Regional High School, in Middle Village, Queens, New York.

College career
Alexis played college basketball for the Syracuse Orangemen, from 1982 until 1986, being a starter during his senior year.

Professional career
Alexis was drafted by the Golden State Warriors, just one pick ahead of future Hall of Fame member Dražen Petrović. Alexis never played in the National Basketball Association (NBA), though, but he went on to play in Europe until 2004. He settled in Spain for his first two years there, winning the Korać Cup in 1988, with Real Madrid. From 1988 until 1993, Alexis played in Italy, where he reached the domestic championship's finals in 1989, as a team member of Enichem Livorno. After a brief return to Forum Valladolid, he moved to Israel. As a player for Maccabi Tel Aviv, he won the Israeli League championship. Alexis spent another year in Italy, at Reggio Calabria, before joining French club Levallois.

He then moved to Berlin for ALBA, where he would stay until 2002. Alexis won the German League championship every season there, and he was chosen as the competition's MVP in 1997, 1998, 2000, and 2002. He is still the club's all-time leading scorer, with 5,922 points scored overall, being dubbed "Iceman" by the fans. Alexis competed in the FIBA EuroStars games of 1997–98 and 1998–99, as a member of the Western rosters.

After playing with the Greek club PAOK, for one year, Alexis returned to Germany, and won the FIBA Europe Cup (FIBA EuroCup Challenge) title with Mitteldeutscher BC.

National team career
Alexis also represented the senior United States national team at the 1998 FIBA World Championship, where Team USA played without any NBA players being available, due to the NBA lockout. He won the bronze medal at the tournament, and he was the team's second best scorer.

Coaching career
After the end of his active professional basketball playing career, Alexis worked as an assistant coach of the NJIT Highlanders college basketball team. In September 2008, Alexis was named an assistant coach of the NBA Development League's Austin Toros.

References

External links 
 FIBA Europe Profile
 Euroleague.net Profile
 Italian League Profile 
 Spanish League Profile  
 
 Sports-Reference.com Profile
 Biography at the New Jersey Institute of Technology
 College stats at orangehoops.org

1964 births
Living people
1998 FIBA World Championship players
Alba Berlin players
Basketball coaches from New York (state)
American expatriate basketball people in Germany
American expatriate basketball people in Greece
American expatriate basketball people in Israel
American expatriate basketball people in Italy
American expatriate basketball people in Spain
American men's basketball coaches
American men's basketball players
Basketball players from New York City
CB Valladolid players
Golden State Warriors draft picks
Israeli Basketball Premier League players
Levallois Sporting Club Basket players
Libertas Liburnia Basket Livorno players
Liga ACB players
Maccabi Tel Aviv B.C. players
Mens Sana Basket players
Mitteldeutscher BC players
NJIT Highlanders men's basketball coaches
P.A.O.K. BC players
Power forwards (basketball)
Real Madrid Baloncesto players
Sportspeople from Brooklyn
Syracuse Orange men's basketball players
United States men's national basketball team players
Viola Reggio Calabria players